RPZ may refer to:

 Reduced pressure zone device, a type of backflow prevention device
 Response policy zone, a mechanism for use by Domain Name System recursive resolvers
 Residents parking zone, practice of designating certain on-street car parking spaces for the exclusive use of nearby residents